2008–09 in men's cyclo-cross covers the major Cyclo-cross competitions in the 2008–09 season, which runs from September 2008 until March 2009.

The competitions considered are the World Championships, National championships, the World Cup, the Superprestige and the Gazet van Antwerpen Trophy. Results of single day races of type C1 (the highest class) are also given.

World championships

National Championships

World Cup

Superprestige

Gazet van Antwerpen

Other Major (Class C1) 2008–09 Cyclo-cross races

See also
 2008-09 UCI Results list
 2008 and 2009 in sports
 2007–08 and 2009–10 in men's cyclo-cross.

2008 in cyclo-cross
2009 in cyclo-cross
Cyclo-cross by year